Frederick Carl Frieseke (April 7, 1874 – August 24, 1939) was an American Impressionist painter who spent most of his life as an expatriate in France. An influential member of the Giverny art colony, his paintings often concentrated on various effects of dappled sunlight. He is especially known for painting female subjects, both indoors and out.

Background and early life
In 1858, Frederick Carl Frieseke's grandparents, Frederick Frieseke and his wife, emigrated from Pritzerbe (near Brandenburg, Germany) with their sons, including Herman Carl. They settled in the small central Michigan town of Owosso. Herman served in the Union Army then returned to Owosso, where he established a brick manufacturing business. He married Eva Graham and in 1871 their daughter Edith was born. Their son, Frederick Carl, was born in Owosso in 1874. Eva died in 1880 when Frederick was six years old, and in about 1881 the family moved to Florida. Herman started another brick manufacturing business in Jacksonville. The four years in Florida left an enduring impression on young Frederick; years later, when he contemplated a return to the United States from Europe, he concentrated on Florida.

Frederick's aunt recounted how, unlike most boys, he was interested in the arts more than in sports. His grandmother, Valetta Gould Graham, enjoyed painting, and encouraged Frederick in his artistic pursuits. An 1893 visit to the World's Columbian Exposition in Chicago also stimulated his desire to become an artist.

Education

In 1893, Frieseke graduated from Owosso High School, then began his artistic training at the Art Institute of Chicago, studying with Frederick Warren Freer and John Vanderpoel. After moving to New York in 1895, he resumed his art education at the Art Students League in 1897. He worked as an illustrator, selling cartoons he had drawn to The New York Times, Puck, and Truth. He claimed that he might have curtailed his art education if he had been more successful in that endeavor. The following year, he moved to France, where he would remain, except for short visits to the United States and elsewhere, as an expatriate for the rest of his life. He did continue his education, enrolling at the Académie Julian in Paris, studying under Jean-Joseph Benjamin-Constant and Jean-Paul Laurens, and receiving criticism from Auguste Joseph Delécluse. His studies also included some time at Académie Carmen under James Abbott McNeill Whistler. Frieseke visited Holland, including the Katwijk and Laren artist colonies, in the summer of 1898. During this time he sketched and painted in watercolors, and he initially planned to make that his specialty, but he was encouraged by Académie Carmen instructor Frederick William MacMonnies to work in oils.

Frieseke discounted his formal art education, referring to himself as self-taught; he felt that he had learned more from his independent study of artists' work than he had from his academic studies.

Life and work

Starting in 1899, just over a year since his arrival in Paris, Frieseke exhibited at the Salon of the Société Nationale des Beaux-Arts.

Whistler's influence is evident in Frieseke's early mature paintings, with close tonalities. By his post-1900 work, his palette had evolved toward that of the Impressionists, becoming light and colorful; however, he still retained the strong linear customs of art back in the United States.

In the summer of 1905, he spent at least a month in the Giverny art colony. In October of that year he married Sarah Anne O'Bryan (known as Sadie), whom he had met seven years earlier. Frieseke and his wife (and later, their daughter) spent every summer from 1906 to 1919 in Giverny. He kept a Paris apartment and studio throughout his life, and the Friesekes spent the winters in Paris. Their Giverny house, previously the residence of Theodore Robinson, was next door to Claude Monet's. Despite the proximity, Frieseke did not become close friends with Monet, nor was Monet an artistic influence. He said in an interview, "No artist in [the impressionist] school has influenced me except, perhaps, Renoir." Indeed, Frieseke's paintings of sensually rounded figures often bear a resemblance to those of Pierre-Auguste Renoir.

The Friesekes' Giverny home and the garden they created there were often featured in his paintings, and his wife would frequently pose for him. He also kept another studio nearby on the Epte river. Many of his outdoor nudes were painted there.

After spending some time in Giverny, his unique style quickly emerged, and he would be quite influential with most of the other members of the colony. Although well known as an Impressionist, some of his work, with its "intense, almost arbitrary colors", demonstrates the Post-Impressionist influence of artists Paul Gauguin and Pierre Bonnard. The term "Decorative Impressionism" was coined by an art writer to refer to Frieseke's style. It combined the decorative  style of Les Nabis, expressively using color and pattern, with classic Impressionist interests in atmosphere and sunlight.

He was very interested in rendering sunlit subjects on canvas, saying, "It is sunshine, flowers in sunshine; girls in sunshine; the nude in sunshine, which I have been principally interested in. If I could only reproduce it exactly as I see it I would be satisfied." However, his interpretation of sunshine often did not appear natural. According to a recent observer, "His light hardly seems to be plein air light at all. In fact it seems entirely artificial ... a stunning concoction of blues and magentas frosted with early summer green and flecks of white."

The prestigious Venice Biennale featured seventeen Frieseke paintings in 1909.

Frieseke's artistic influence was greatly felt among the Americans in Giverny, most of whom shared his Midwestern background and had also begun their art studies in Chicago. Among those artists were Louis Ritman, Karl Anderson, Lawton Parker, and Karl Buehr.

Frieseke preferred the attitudes in France over those which he encountered in the United States: "I am more free and there are not the Puritanical restrictions which prevail in America – here I can paint the nude out of doors." He found the American attitudes to be frustrating, but occasionally a source of amusement. While on his first visit back home in Owosso in 1902, Frieseke wrote, "I get much pleasure in shocking the good Church people with the nudes".

The Friesekes' only child, daughter Frances, was born in 1914. In 1920 Frieseke and his family moved to a farm in Le Mesnil-sur-Blangy, Normandy. His art of this period concentrated on female figures, particularly nudes. While developing a more modern style, he included historical and contemporary references. He used a darker color palette and limited his use of surface patterns. In these works, his interest in chiaroscuro may be discerned.

In 1923 he left the Salon of the Société Nationale des Beaux-Arts and co-founded, with other artists, the Salon des Tuileries. He resumed painting in watercolors, especially while on trips to Nice in the winter and during a 1930 to 1932 visit to Switzerland.

Frieseke had established a superb reputation during his career. A 1931 book refers to Frieseke as "one of the most prominent members of our self-exiled Americans." He died in his Normandy home on August 24, 1939, of an aneurysm.

Awards

He won many awards during his career. In 1904 he received a silver medal in St. Louis at the Louisiana Purchase Exposition and was awarded a gold medal at the Munich International Art Exposition. He was honored with the William A. Clark Prize at the Corcoran Gallery of Art's 1908 biennial, and the Temple Gold Medal in the Pennsylvania Academy of the Fine Arts' annual exhibition of 1913. One of his greatest honors was winning the Grand Prize at the Panama–Pacific International Exposition, which was held in San Francisco in 1915. Among his entries was Summer, now at the Metropolitan Museum of Art. The New York Times proclaimed in June 1915: "Mr. Frieseke, whose accomplished work is well known to New Yorkers, says the last word in the style that was modern before the Modernists came along. Whatever he does has a sense of design, color, and style. A sense of gayety, an entertaining and well considered pattern, a remarkable knowledge of the effect of outdoor light on color are found in nearly all of his most recent paintings."

He received two gold medals from the Art Institute of Chicago in 1920 and he also won the popular prize, decided by artists as well as the viewing public.

Frieseke was elected an Associate of the National Academy of Design (ANA) in 1912, and an Academician (NA) in 1914. He was decorated as a Chevalier of the French Legion of Honour in 1920, a rare recognition for an American painter.

Collections

Frieseke's work is in many major collections including:

Addison Gallery of American Art, Andover, Massachusetts
Akron Art Museum, Akron, Ohio
Art Institute of Chicago
Brigham Young University Museum of Art, Provo, Utah
Brooklyn Museum, New York City
Butler Institute of American Art, Ohio
Chrysler Museum of Art, Norfolk, Virginia
Corcoran Gallery of Art, Washington D.C.
Crocker Art Museum, Sacramento, California
Cummer Museum of Art and Gardens, Jacksonville, Florida
Detroit Institute of Arts
Georgia Museum of Art, Athens, Georgia
Grand Rapids Art Museum
Hirshhorn Museum and Sculpture Garden, Washington D.C.
Huntington Library, San Marino, California
Indianapolis Museum of Art
Los Angeles County Museum of Art
Maier Museum of Art at Randolph College, Lynchburg, Virginia
Metropolitan Museum of Art, New York City
Minneapolis Institute of Arts
Musée -américain du château de Blérancourt
Musée Léon Dierx, Saint-Denis, Réunion
Museo d'Art Moderna de Ca' Pesaro, Venice
Museum of Fine Arts, Boston
Museum of Fine Arts, Houston
Museum of the National Academy of Design, New York City
Musée des Impressionnismes (formerly the Musée d'Art Américain), Giverny
National Gallery of Art, Washington D.C.
National Museums Liverpool
New Britain Museum of American Art, Connecticut
North Carolina Museum of Art, Raleigh
Pennsylvania Academy of the Fine Arts, Philadelphia
Philadelphia Museum of Art
Saint Louis Art Museum, Saint Louis, Missouri
Shiawassee Arts Center, Owosso, Michigan
Smithsonian American Art Museum, Washington D.C.
Telfair Museum of Art, Savannah, Georgia
Terra Foundation for American Art, Chicago
Thyssen-Bornemisza Museum, Madrid
Virginia Museum of Fine Arts, Richmond
University of Michigan Museum of Art, Ann Arbor, Michigan
Wichita Art Museum

Gallery

References

Sources

Further reading

External links

Frederick Carl Frieseke, site maintained by his granddaughter Miriam A. Kilmer
Frederick Carl Frieseke, ArtCyclopedia

Nine exhibition catalogs available as full-text PDFs from The Metropolitan Museum of Art Libraries.
American impressionism and realism : a landmark exhibition from the Met, a 1991 exhibition catalog from the Metropolitan Museum of Art libraries
 Frederick Carl Frieseke Biography: Hollis Taggart Galleries 

19th-century American painters
American male painters
20th-century American painters
American Impressionist painters
Artists from Michigan
Académie Julian alumni
Art Students League of New York alumni
School of the Art Institute of Chicago alumni
Chevaliers of the Légion d'honneur
American people of German descent
National Academy of Design members
People from Owosso, Michigan
Artists from Jacksonville, Florida
Deaths from aneurysm
1874 births
1939 deaths
Académie Carmen alumni
19th-century American male artists
20th-century American male artists